Saturday Night and Sunday Morning is a 1960 British kitchen sink drama film directed by Karel Reisz and produced by Tony Richardson. It is an adaptation of the 1958 novel of the same name by Alan Sillitoe, who also wrote the screenplay adaptation. The film is about a young teddy boy machinist, Arthur, who spends his weekends drinking and partying, all the while having an affair with a married woman.

The film is one of a series of "kitchen sink drama" films made in the late 1950s and early 1960s, as part of the British New Wave of filmmaking, from directors such as Reisz, Jack Clayton, Lindsay Anderson, John Schlesinger and Tony Richardson and adapted from the works of writers such as Sillitoe, John Braine and John Osborne. A common trope in these films was the working-class "angry young man" character (in this case, the character of Arthur), who rebels against the oppressive system of his elders.

In 1999, the British Film Institute named Saturday Night and Sunday Morning the 14th greatest British film of all time on its Top 100 British films list.

Plot
Arthur Seaton is a young machinist at the Raleigh bicycle factory in Nottingham. He is determined not to be tied down to living a life of domestic drudgery like the people around him, including his parents, whom he describes as "dead from the neck up". He spends his wages at weekends on drinking and having a good time.

Arthur is having an affair with Brenda, the wife of an older colleague. He also begins a more traditional relationship with Doreen, a beautiful single woman closer to his age. Doreen, who lives with her mother and aspires to be married, avoids Arthur's sexual advances, so he continues to see Brenda as a sexual outlet.

Brenda becomes pregnant by Arthur, who offers to help raise the child or terminate the unwanted pregnancy (as abortion was not legal in Britain at the time of the film). Arthur takes her to see his Aunt Ada for advice. Ada has Brenda sit in a hot bath and drink gin, which does not work. Brenda asks Arthur for £40 to get an abortion from a doctor.

After Doreen complains about not going anywhere public with Arthur, he takes her to the fair where he sees Brenda. Arthur pulls Brenda aside, and she reveals that she has decided to have the child. As Arthur clings to her, she wriggles free because she is at the fair with her family. Arthur follows her on to an amusement ride and gets in a car with her. Brenda's brother-in-law and his friend—both soldiers—notice her enter the ride and follow her, shocked to see Arthur riding with his arm around Brenda. Arthur escapes the ride, but he later is caught and beaten.

Arthur spends a week recovering and is visited by Doreen; they later have sex. After recovering, Arthur returns to work and realizes his affair with Brenda is finished after her husband tells him to stay away from Brenda. Arthur decides to marry Doreen. The film ends with Arthur and Doreen discussing the prospect of a new home together, with Arthur showing that he still has mixed feelings about settling into domestic life.

Cast

 Albert Finney as Arthur Seaton 
 Shirley Anne Field as Doreen 
 Rachel Roberts as Brenda 
 Hylda Baker as Aunt Ada 
 Norman Rossington as Bert 
 Bryan Pringle as Jack 
 Robert Cawdron as Robboe 
 Edna Morris as Mrs Bull 
 Elsie Wagstaff as Mrs Seaton 
 Frank Pettitt as Mr Seaton 
 Avis Bunnage as Blousy Woman 
 Colin Blakely as Loudmouth 
 Irene Richmond as Doreen's Mother 
 Louise Dunn as Betty 
 Anne Blake as Civil Defence Officer 
 Frank Smith as himself
 Peter Madden as Drunken Man 
 Cameron Hall as Mr Bull 
 Alister Williamson as Police Constable
 Peter Sallis as man in Suit (uncredited)
 Jack Smethurst as Waiter (uncredited)

Production

Style
Saturday Night and Sunday Morning was at the forefront of the British New Wave, portraying British working class life in a serious manner for the first time and dealing realistically with sex and abortion. It was among the first of the "kitchen sink dramas" that followed the success of the play Look Back in Anger. Producer Tony Richardson later directed another such film, The Loneliness of the Long Distance Runner (1962), which was also adapted from an Alan Sillitoe book of the same name.

Saturday Night and Sunday Morning received an X rating from the BBFC upon its theatrical release.   It was re-rated PG for the 1990 home video release.

Filming locations
Much of the exterior location filming was shot in Nottingham, but some scenes were shot elsewhere. The night scene with a pub named The British Flag in the background was filmed along Culvert Road in Battersea, London, the pub being at the junction of Culvert Road and Sheepcote Lane (now Rowditch Lane).

The closing scenes show Arthur and Doreen on a grassy slope overlooking a housing estate with new construction that is being developed. According to an article in the Nottingham Evening News on 30 March 1960, this was shot in Wembley with the assistance of Nottingham builders Simms Sons & Cooke.

Finance
Bryanston guaranteed £81,820 of the budget, the NFFC provided £28,000, Twickenham Studios provided £610 and Richardson deferred his producers fee of £965. The film went £3,500 over budget and two days over schedule when filming at a Nottingham factory proved more difficult than expected. Woodfall bought the rights to the novel from Joseph Janni for £2,000 and got Stiltoe to do the script because they could not afford a professional screenwriter. The film made a profit of £500,000.

Reception
Saturday Night and Sunday Morning opened at the Warner cinema in London's West End on 27 October 1960 and received generally favourable reviews. The film entered general release on the ABC cinema circuit from late January 1961 and was a box-office success, being the third most popular film in Britain that year. It earned over £500,000 in profit.

Bryanston earned £145,000 in profit on the film.

After viewing this film, Ian Fleming sold the rights to the James Bond series to Saltzman, who with Albert R "Cubby" Broccoli would co-produce every James Bond film between Dr. No (1962) and The Man with the Golden Gun (1974).

Awards

Popular culture references
In Richard Lester's 1965 comedy Help! starring The Beatles, Brenda's famous line "I believe you. Thousands wouldn't." is said by a police inspector after he witnesses them being attacked by a cult.

The film is the origin for the title of Whatever People Say I Am, That's What I'm Not, the debut album of indie rock band Arctic Monkeys.

It is the origin for the title of the live album Saturday Night, Sunday Morning by The Stranglers.

"Saturday Night Sunday Morning" is the title of a song from Madness's 1999 album Wonderful.

The run-out groove on the B-side of vinyl copies of The Smiths' 1986 album The Queen Is Dead features the line "Them was rotten days," a line said by Aunt Ada (Hylda Baker) in the film.

Also the line said by Doreen before Arthur takes her to the fair, "Why don't you ever take me where's it lively and there's people?" inspired the song "There Is a Light That Never Goes Out" on the same album ("I want to see people and I want to see life"). Morrissey, the lead singer and lyricist of The Smiths, has stated that the film is one of his favourites.

Arthur Seaton is mentioned in the song "Where Are They Now?" by The Kinks, which appears on their album Preservation Act 1.

Arthur Seaton is mentioned in the song "From Across the Kitchen Table" by The Pale Fountains.

The film is referenced, not least in the form of the promotional video, using elements of the original cinema poster's graphic design, in the 2013 Franz Ferdinand single "Right Action". Some of the song's lyrics were inspired by a postcard found by the band's lead singer Alex Kapranos for sale on a market stall, the postcard being addressed to Karel Reisz, the film's director.

The film is referenced in Torvill and Dean, the biopic of Nottingham ice dancers Jayne Torvill and Christopher Dean. Like Arthur, Jayne's father works in the Raleigh factory, and when a young Jayne mentions the film, her mother scolds her and calls the film "rude".

See also
 BFI Top 100 British films

References

External links
  
  
 
 
 

British New Wave Essay on Saturday Night and Sunday Morning, at BrokenProjector.com. Archived at Webcite from this original URL 2008-05-08.
  Photographs of The White Horse Public House, Nottingham as featured in the film
 

1960 films
1960 directorial debut films
1960 drama films
Adultery in films
Best British Film BAFTA Award winners
British black-and-white films
British drama films
British pregnancy films
Films based on British novels
Films shot in London
Films shot in Nottinghamshire
Films directed by Karel Reisz
Films produced by Harry Saltzman
Films set in Nottingham
Social realism in film
Films scored by John Dankworth
Films about abortion
1960s English-language films
1960s British films